Apenheul Primate Park is a zoo in Apeldoorn, Netherlands. It specializes in apes and monkeys. It opened in 1971 and was the first zoo in the world where monkeys could walk around freely in the forest and between the visitors. It started with just a few species, now it displays more than 30 different primates, among them bonobo, gorilla and orangutan.

History

Apenheul Primate Park was conceptualised by photographer Wim Mager in the 1960s, when it was legal for private citizens to own monkeys. Mager, who himself had several monkeys as pets, believed both humans and primates would benefit from housing the animals in a more natural forest-like environment. He created the apen-heul (from apen meaning monkeys, and heul, an old Dutch word for a safe haven).

Apenheul Primate Park opened in 1971 as a small but revolutionary park housing wool-monkeys and other species. It is located in the nature park of Berg en Bos (Mountain and Wood) and proved popular with visitors and primatologists alike, leading to subsequent expansions. In 1976, gorillas were introduced to Apenheul Primate Park, with the first gorilla baby being born three years later. This was only the second healthy baby that was born in captivity in the Netherlands and the third in the entire world. The baby was raised by its own mother, which remains a rare event.

A major setback occurred in 1981 when the cabin in which Apenheul Primate Park burned to the ground, killing 46 monkeys. The building was subsequently replaced.

Animals
Apenheul is home to about 70 species of animals, 35 of which are primates. The park houses lemurs from Madagascar, monkeys from Central and South America, and monkeys and apes from Asia and Africa. Primates include black-capped squirrel monkeys, yellow-breasted capuchins, black howlers, Lac Alaotra bamboo lemurs, crowned sifakas, ring-tailed lemurs, red ruffed lemurs, black-and-white ruffed lemurs, red bellied lemurs, crowned lemurs, blue-eyed black lemurs, bonobos, Bornean orangutans, East Javan langurs, collared mangabeys, lion-tailed macaques, barbary macaques, western lowland gorillas, patas monkeys, L'Hoest's monkeys, white-faced saki monkeys, golden-headed lion tamarins, northern white-cheeked gibbons, emperor tamarins, silvery marmosets, Goeldi's monkeys, Venezuelan red howlers, grey-legged night monkeys, pygmy marmosets, Colombian white-headed capuchins, Colombian spider monkeys, Hanuman langurs, pied tamarins, red titi monkeys, golden lion tamarins, black-tufted marmosets, black bearded sakis, and woolly monkeys.

Proboscis monkey
In summer 2011, three adult male proboscis monkeys (9-year-old twin brothers Julau and Bagik, and 10-year-old half-brother Bena) joined the collection from Singapore Zoo to commemorate the zoo's fortieth anniversary. In 2012 Bena died due to heart failure. In 2013 Julau died due to liver failure. Later that year two males (Goalie, 3, and Jeff, 4) joined Bagik. However, Goalie died a few months after he arrived due to a blood protein deficiency. Two remained in Apenheul until early 2015 when Bagik, the last of the three original males, died due to a twisted large intestine. In 2015, Jeff left the collection to return to Singapore.

The zoo obtained collared mangabeys in 2016, who live on the old proboscis monkey island. The mangabeys will at some point live with the gorillas together with the L'Hoest's monkeys and potentially the patas monkeys.

See also
La Vallée des Singes

Notes

External links 

Zoos in the Netherlands
Tourist attractions in Gelderland
Buildings and structures in Apeldoorn
Zoos established in 1971